Lennart Björn Alkeby (17 July 1952 – ) is a Swedish former footballer (goalkeeper).

Playing career
Alkeby made his Djurgården debut in the 1971 Allsvenskan in a match against Örgryte IS. He ended his career in 1982, but made an appearance in the 1993 Division 1 Norra at the age of 41 for Djurgården when Djurgården's keepers were injured.

Honours

Club 

 Djurgårdens IF 
 Division 2 Norra (1): 1982

References

Swedish footballers
1952 births
Allsvenskan players
Djurgårdens IF Fotboll players
Living people
Djurgårdens IF Fotboll non-playing staff
Association football goalkeepers